Lyovino is a rural locality (a selo) and the administrative center of Levinskoye Rural Settlement, Bolshesosnovsky District, Perm Krai, Russia. The population was 321 as of 2010. There are 11 streets.

Geography 
Lyovino is located 22 km east of Bolshaya Sosnova (the district's administrative centre) by road. Burdino is the nearest rural locality.

References 

Rural localities in Bolshesosnovsky District